Eskhata Khujand is a football club based in Khujand in Tajikistan.

History
FC Dushanbe-83 earned promotion to the Tajikistan Higher League for the first time in 2019, after finishing second in the 2020 Tajikistan First League.

Domestic history

Current squad
''

References

External links

Football clubs in Tajikistan